The Jalisco Cartel New Generation-Los Caballeros Templarios Cartel War was a conflict between two powerful drug cartels in Mexico. The war ended with the victory of the Jalisco New Generation Cartel and the dissolution of the Knights Templar Cartel. The war started after in 2010 when the Los Zetas-La Familia Michoacana war ended with the expulsions or executions of Los Zetas operatives in the states of Jalisco and Michoacán.The newly formed Sinaloa Cartel enforcer group Los Matazetas (Later called Jalisco New Generation Cartel) declared war on the Knights Of Templar Cartel in Michoacán and Guerrero.

References

2010s conflicts